Maarten Hurkmans (born 29 August 1997) is a Dutch rower.

He won a medal at the 2019 World Rowing Championships. He came out as bisexual in June 2020.

References

External links

1997 births
Living people
Dutch male rowers
World Rowing Championships medalists for the Netherlands
California Golden Bears athletes
Bisexual men 
Dutch LGBT sportspeople
Bisexual sportspeople
Rowers at the 2020 Summer Olympics
21st-century Dutch people